Alexander Malcolm Manson (October 7, 1883 – September 25, 1964) was a British Columbia judge and politician in the Liberal Party. Positions he held included Speaker, Minister of Labour and Attorney General. He was later appointed to the Supreme Court of British Columbia.

Biography 
Alexander Malcolm Manson was born in St. Louis, Missouri on October 7, 1883. After completing a bachelor's degree at the University of Toronto, Manson studied at Osgoode Hall Law School. In 1908, he became the first lawyer to practice in Prince Rupert, British Columbia. He married Stella Beckwith on June 29, 1909.

In the B.C. legislature, he represented the district of Omineca where he was elected in 1916, and re-elected four times in the 1920s and 1930s. He was Speaker of the Legislative Assembly in 1921. From April 12, 1922 to August 17, 1927, he was both Attorney General and Minister of Labour in John Oliver's Liberal government. As Attorney General, he was criticized for his handling of the 1924 Janet Smith murder case, which would damage his political career. Nevertheless, he continued in this dual role in John Duncan MacLean's government from 20 August 1927 to 20 August 1928. His legislative work included interest in liquor laws, narcotics laws, the Pacific Great Eastern Railway, and game conservation laws.

In the mid-1920s, he also served as Grand Master of the Grand Lodge of British Columbia and Yukon.

In 1935, he attempted to enter federal politics, running for the Liberal Party of Canada in the riding of Vancouver South, but lost by less than 300 votes to Conservative Howard Charles Green.

He served on the Supreme Court of British Columbia from 1936 until he retired in 1961.

He died from cancer in Vancouver on September 25, 1964.

References 

1883 births
1964 deaths
British Columbia Liberal Party MLAs
Speakers of the Legislative Assembly of British Columbia
Judges in British Columbia
Attorneys General of British Columbia
American emigrants to Canada